Trafficking protein particle complex subunit 2 (TRAPPC2) also known as MBP-1-interacting protein 2A (MIP-2A) is a protein that in humans is encoded by the TRAPPC2 gene. A processed pseudogene of this gene is located on chromosome 19, and other pseuodogenes of it are found on chromosome 8 and the Y chromosome. Two transcript variants encoding the same protein have been found for this gene.

Function 

Trafficking protein particle complex subunit 2 is thought to be part of a large multisubunit complex involved in the targeting and fusion of endoplasmic reticulum-to-Golgi transport vesicles with their acceptor compartment. In addition, the encoded protein can bind MBP1 and block its transcriptional repression capability.

Genetic Location 

The TRAPPC2 gene is located on the X-chromosome at position 22 between base-pairs 13,712,241 to 13,734,634.

Clinical significance 

Mutations in this gene are a cause of X-linked spondyloepiphyseal dysplasia tarda (SEDT).

Interactions 

TRAPPC2 has been shown to interact with Alpha-enolase and CLIC1.

References

Further reading

External links 
  GeneReviews/NIH/NCBI/UW entry on X-Linked Spondyloepiphyseal Dysplasia Tarda
  OMIM entries on X-Linked Spondyloepiphyseal Dysplasia Tarda